Jean-Baptiste Barthélémy Thomas, comte d’Orves (1727 — Orient, off Madras, 9 February 1782 ) was a French Navy officer, who rose to have flag officer rank.

Biography 
Thomas d'Estienne d'Orves was born to the Estienne Family, a noble house of Provence.

Estienne d'Orves took part in the Battle of Ushant on 27 July 1778, captaining the 74-gun Actif.

In 1778, Estienne d'Orves was in command of the 80-gun Orient, with the rank of captain. On 28 December, during the Anglo-French War, he departed Brest to reinforce the French colony of Isle de France. When François-Jean-Baptiste l'Ollivier de Tronjoli, commander of the French forces in the Indian Ocean, was recalled to France, he transferred command to Estienne d'Orves.

Estienne d'Orves led his squadron off the Coromandel Coast, with little effect. In April 1781, his health deteriorating, Estienne d'Orves gave command of the division to Tromelin, and that of Orient to First Officer Bolle. Suffren arrived at Isle de France with reinforcements on 25 October 1781, and Estienne d'Orves decided to mount a raid against British interests in India.

On 7 December 1781, Estienne d'Orves departed Isle de France with  11 ships, 3 frigates and 3 corvettes, intending to attack Trincomalee. However, he changed his mind and decided to attack Madras instead. However, in the following days, his failing health deteriorated to the point where he was not fit for duty, and he delegated command to Suffren. He died on 9 February 1782, a few days before the Battle of Sadras.

Assessment 
Charles Cunat compares d'Orves to Tronjoli in that they both failed to seize the initiative against the British, and contrasts them to Suffren's skill. Admiral Rémi Monaque called d'Orves a "rather mediocre admiral".

Sources and references 
 Notes

References

 Bibliography
 
 , CC-BY-NC-ND 4.0
 

1729 births
1788 deaths
People from Aix-en-Provence
French Navy admirals
Counts of France
French military personnel of the American Revolutionary War